Zap Energy is an American company that aims to commercialize fusion power through use of a sheared-flow-stabilized Z-pinch. The company is based near Seattle with research facilities in Everett and Mukilteo, Washington.

The conceptual basis for the technology was developed at the University of Washington led by Uri Shumlak. Zap Energy formed following the positive initial results achieved by the FuZE device as part of ARPA-E's ALPHA program. The company was co-founded by British entrepreneur and investor Benj Conway (President, CEO), together with nuclear physicists Brian A. Nelson (Chief Technology Officer) and Uri Shumlak (Chief Science Officer).

Sheared-flow-stabilized Z-pinch fusion 

The pinch effect is one of the earliest methods of fusion power to be explored. It relies on the fact that a current flowing in a conductor will produce an inward-directed force, squeezing the conductor. In the case of a fusion device, the conductor is a plasma of the fusion fuel itself. The current is either induced using an external magnet, or directly applied using electrodes in the reaction chamber. The device's relative simplicity led many researchers around the world to attempt to build pinch systems.

In early experiments, pinch systems were found to be unstable and the plasma was quickly forced into the walls of the reaction chamber, cooling it off so that fusion would not occur. This led to the development of the stabilized pinch machines, with the most notable example being the UK's ZETA. At first it appeared these designs were free from the instabilities of the earlier devices. However, further investigation showed that new "microinstabilities" were just as effective at destroying confinement as the earlier, larger, instabilities had been. With no obvious solution to these new class of problems, major research on the classic pinch devices ended by the early 1960s.

The idea of using the flow of the plasma as an additional stabilizing force developed in the 1990s. In this concept, the pinch is developed such that the plasma flows at different speeds as one moves out from the center of the plasma column, with the outer layers being about ten times as fast as the center. As the magnetic field created by the pinch current is a function of both the density and speed of the charges, this causes the resulting pinch field to be non-linear across the plasma column. This surpasses the growth rate of the kink, sausage and interchange instability. The exact conditions that need to be reached to stabilize the pinch is still an open area of research.

History

Zap Energy can trace its technical origins to the work of Dr. Uri Shumlak at the University of Washington starting in 1995. The university built three experimental machines to test the flowing pinch: 

 ZaP (1998-2012 at UW) 
 ZaP-HD (2012-present at UW) 
 FuZE (2015-2020 at UW; 2021-present at Zap Energy)

Since then Zap Energy has built a next generation machine, FuZE-Q (2021-present at Zap Energy). Because shots on the flowing pinch were much smaller in volume than in a Tokamak and much longer in lifetime than an ICF implosion, the Shumlak lab had to develop custom tools to measure their plasmas.

Zap Energy was founded in 2017 as a spin-off from the FuZE (Fusion Z-pinch Experiment) research team at the University of Washington and collaborations with researchers from Lawrence Livermore National Laboratory. Zap created their first fusion reaction as a company in 2018, but in November of 2021, Livermore National Laboratory provided an independent and more precise measurement of neutron production inside the flowing pinch, proving that the machine can do fusion with deuterium fuel.  The effort was led by ARPA-E, where the agency organized fusion teams to support private fusion companies.

The Zap Energy reactor is a pulsed power system with no external magnets. The company aims to scale their reactor to maintain plasma stability at increasingly higher energy levels, with the goal of achieving scientific breakeven and eventual commercial profitability.

From 2015 to 2020, a series of U.S. Department of Energy grants enabled the team to test their sheared-flow-stabilized Z-pinch reactor at progressively higher energy levels.

In July 2020, Zap Energy raised $6.5 million in Series A funding. 

In May 2021 Zap closed $27.5 million in Series B funding including from Addition, Energy Impact Partners, Chevron Technology Ventures and Lowercarbon Capital.
 Chevron's financing was the first investment in fusion energy by a major U.S. oil company but not the first investment by an oil firm into fusion.  The Italian oil company ENI backed Commonwealth Fusion Systems in 2018.

In June 2022, Zap Energy announced first plasmas in their breakeven device (FuZE-Q) and a $160 million Series C raise backed by Lowercarbon Capital, Bill Gates's Breakthrough Energy Ventures, Shell PLC, Valor, DCVC, Energy Impact Partners, Chevron and others.

Design

Since 1999, the flowing pinch has been tested in a series of experimental devices.  The machine is a ~2 meter long metal tube with a cathode running halfway down the middle.  A voltage is applied between the central cathode and the grounded wall.  Fusion fuel is puffed in the back of the machine, which ionizes due to Paschen breakdown creating a plasma. This plasma sweeps forward and assembles into a ~50 cm long flowing pinch in the gap between the cathode and the wall.  The University of Washington has outfitted these machines with several tools to measure the performance of the flowing pinch. Among them includes:  
 Ion Spectroscopy is used to measure the temperature of the plasma and in the flowing pinches' case it measures the emissions from Carbon-III impurities inside the plasma. 
 Fast Cameras are used to get overall photos and video of the pinch performance.  In 2019, the team used a 5 million frame per second camera made by Kirana in the UK. 
 Interferometry is used to measure the density of the plasma across the flowing pinch.  The tool passes a test laser beam through the plasma and compares it to a reference beam to measure the plasma density.  But, this tool is limited because it can only measure densities along the narrow path where the laser travels (known as a Chord).
 Magnetic Field Probes line the surface of the tube to measure the field generated by the flowing pinch current.

Other diagnostic tools have also been used to measure the pinches, many in partnership with experimenters from national laboratories.

Scaling up 

Zap Energy has argued that the rate of fusion in a flowing pinch scales as the pinch current to the 11th power and that because of this, all that is needed to generate net power from a flowing pinch is higher current.  However, this scaling model is based on adiabatic plasmas and that model fails to capture all real-world behavior.

Critics have pointed out that when the flowing pinch goes to higher currents, it could introduce  drift instabilities and  shockwaves that could tear the plasma apart. In the case of drift waves, the (+) ions and (-) electrons would move at different speeds because of their mass differences, and this would rip the plasma apart.  Shockwaves could also form during the assembly process of the pinch, when the plasma sweeps together at high speeds, the two plasma waves could form a shockwave at higher speeds.  Finding other ways to form the pinch plasma are possible solutions to this problem. 

Supporting simulations have argued that to reach net power ~650 kiloamps (kA) of current is needed through the flowing pinch.  As of late 2021 the company was testing with currents in FuZE reaching 500 kA.

Challenges
The higher pinch currents that are needed for scale-up introduce the possibility of electrode melting and  electrode erosion.  This kind of erosion has been researched extensively within the field of spacecraft electric propulsion.  In 2021, Zap's cathodes were made from copper coated with Tungsten carbide, which has a maximum melting point of 3,103 kelvin.  Materials like graphene are a possible solution. The machines could also be built with bigger spot sizes, active cooling or another work around.  

Another critique is that the volume of plasma inside the narrow pinch beam is relatively small when compared to fusion machines like magnetic mirrors, tokamaks or other fusion approaches. This caps the amount of fusion fuel, and subsequently, the amount of energy that can be made in a flowing pinch. Higher shot rates, multiple machines, longer and wider pinch beams are all possible solutions to this problem.

Power plant 
Zap Energy has proposed to surround the pinch with molten blanket to absorb the material coming off the pinch.  This approach is similar to those proposed by First Light Fusion and General Fusion.

See also
 Fusion Power
 Z-Pinch
 History of nuclear fusion
 List of fusion power technologies

References

External links 
 Official website

Energy companies of the United States
Nuclear fusion
Companies based in Seattle